Rosetta is an unincorporated community in Wilkinson County, Mississippi.

Notable people
David Green, Mississippi state legislator and businessman, was born in Rosetta.

References

Unincorporated communities in Wilkinson County, Mississippi
Unincorporated communities in Mississippi